The Rosa Parks Story is a 2002 American television movie written by Paris Qualles and directed by Julie Dash. Angela Bassett portrays Rosa Parks, with Cicely Tyson in a supporting role as her mother. It was broadcast by CBS on February 24, 2002. It received awards from the NAACP and the Black Reel Awards.

Background and synopsis
The film is an account of the life of Mrs. Rosa Louise McCauly Parks and her actions in the civil rights movement. After she refused to give up her seat for a White man on a racially segregated bus after a long day at work, she was arrested. Her example and treatment prompted a bus boycott as a major civil rights demonstration in Montgomery, Alabama; it lasted 381 days from 1955 to 1956.

In the film, Parks's background is highlighted, and the issues in the segregated society of Alabama and the Deep South are indicated. As a child, Rosa was educated at a private school run by the Religious Society of Friends (Quakers), where she was encouraged to overcome the limits of segregation. In her late-adolescence, she married Raymond Parks, a barber and advocate of equal rights. She joins the local branch of the NAACP, although her husband believes that the organization has been ineffective in its battle against legalized racism. She worked as a seamstress in a department store.

On December 1, 1955, after a tiring day at work, Rosa Parks took a seat in the designated "colored" section of a city bus in Montgomery, Alabama. When the "White" section at the front filled up, the driver, James Blake, ordered Parks to relinquish her seat, as was the practice. She refused, and was arrested and jailed. Civil rights activists organized a one-day bus boycott the day of her trial (she was fined). With its success, they founded the Montgomery Improvement Association, and began a citywide bus boycott, led by a new local minister, Dr. Martin Luther King Jr. The boycott lasted 381 days, made to work by African-American citizens, many of whom made sacrifices of time and energy to walk to work and other destinations. As they comprised the majority of bus passengers, the boycott greatly reduced the profits the bus company earned. Eventually, the a ruling by the United States Supreme Court, in a related case, declared bus segregation unconstitutional. The boycott was important for mobilizing people in the civil rights movement both in the Deep South and on a nationwide basis across the United States.

In 1995 Rosa Parks was awarded the Presidential Medal of Freedom.

Cast

 Angela Bassett as Rosa Parks
 Peter Francis James as Raymond Parks
 Cicely Tyson as Leona McCauley, Rosa's mother.
 Dexter Scott King as Martin Luther King Jr.

Awards
The film was named the Best Television Movie in the NAACP Image Awards. Angela Bassett won the NAACP Image Award for Outstanding Actress in a Television Movie, Mini-Series or Dramatic Special for her performance. 
2003, Black Reel Awards went to Bassett as Best Actress, Cicely Tyson as Best Supporting Actress, Paris Qualles for his teleplay, and the film as Best Network/Cable Film.
It also won the Family Television Award and the New York Christopher Award.
For the 55th Annual Directors Guild Awards, Julie Dash was nominated for her Outstanding Directorial Achievement on The Rosa Parks Story. She was the first African-American woman nominated in the category of "Primetime Movies Made for Television".

See also
 Civil rights movement in popular culture

References

External links
 The Rosa Parks Story, 2002, CBS website
 
 

2002 television films
2002 films
2002 biographical drama films
African-American biographical dramas
Films set in the 1950s
Films set in 1955
Films set in Alabama
Films shot in Alabama
Drama films based on actual events
Films about race and ethnicity
CBS network films
Civil rights movement in television
Films about activists
Cultural depictions of Martin Luther King Jr.
Cultural depictions of Rosa Parks
2002 drama films
Films directed by Julie Dash
2000s American films